Campiglossa umbrata is a species of tephritid or fruit flies in the genus Campiglossa of the family Tephritidae.

Distribution
The species is found in Mexico.

References

Tephritinae
Insects described in 1907
Diptera of North America